Phase2 International , Phase 2, was a privately owned, US-based cloud computing provider headquartered in Honolulu, HI. The company offered hosted business software and cloud servers, including information technology knowledge, security, compliance, and an integrated suite of software applications on a customizable monthly subscription basis. Phase 2 served the Federal, SMB, and enterprise markets, providing access to IBM, Microsoft and other business software.

Background

Phase 2 International's stated mission is to participate in the ongoing business-software environment's transformation from purchased to cloud software models. In April 2008, the company introduced a reseller program to supplement its application offerings. Phase2's CEO is Kevin Doherty.

Products

Hosted IBM Lotus Notes, IBM Connections, IBM Lotus Sametime, IBM WebSphere Portal.  Hosted Microsoft SharePoint, Microsoft Exchange, Microsoft Team Foundation Server, and Microsoft Project Server. Other products offered are Cloud Servers (Windows, Linux, Domino), and Security Hardened Cloud Servers with FISMA, HIPAA, GLBA compliance.

References

External links
http://arquivo.pt/wayback/20081025005451/http%3A//www.phase2.com/

Software companies based in Hawaii
Companies based in Honolulu
Software companies established in 2002
2002 establishments in Hawaii
Defunct software companies of the United States
Privately held companies based in Hawaii
Companies established in 2002
Cloud computing providers
Business software companies